The Nelson Examiner and New Zealand Chronicle (also known as The Nelson [Daily] Examiner, was the first newspaper published in New Zealand's South Island. It was launched in 1842 by Charles Elliott (1811–1876), a few weeks after New Zealand Company settlers arrived in Nelson. In its early years the newspaper was criticised for its supposed lack of independence and for being merely a mouthpiece for the New Zealand Company.

Brothers Charles and James Elliott came to Nelson on one of the first four immigrant ships, the Mary Jane, which arrived in Nelson Harbour on 10 February 1842. They brought a printing press with them and the first edition was published on 12 March 1842.

The paper began as a weekly, was published twice weekly from July 1854, and went daily in July 1873. The newspaper folded in the face of competition in 1874.

Digital copies of all issues are available online via the National Library of New Zealand.

References

Newspapers established in 1842
Publications disestablished in 1874
1842 establishments in New Zealand
1874 disestablishments in New Zealand
Mass media in Nelson, New Zealand
Defunct newspapers published in New Zealand